LS I +61 303 is a microquasar, a binary system containing a massive star and a compact object. The compact object is a pulsar and the system is around 7,000 light-years away.

Discovery
LS I +61 303 is an 11th-magnitude star that was recognised as a luminous object and catalogued as an OB star in 1959. It was included in the Hipparcos survey as HIP 12469 and had its parallax measured at  milliarcseconds (mas), revised to − mas in the new reduction. The first Gaia data release gave a parallax of  mas.

The galactic radio source GT 0236+610 was found at the same position as LS I +61 303. A gamma-ray source 2CG 135+01 was found within a degree of its position, and the MAGIC telescope confirmed that LS I +61 303 was the source of the gamma rays. Periodic X-ray outbursts also occur.

Binary system

LS I +61 303 shows the spectrum of a Be star, a B0 main sequence star with disk that produces emission lines in its spectrum. The pair orbit every 26.496 days. Although the uncertain mass of the compact object would allow it to be a neutron star, it is thought likely to be a black hole. In March 2022, a period of ~0.27 s was reported to be detected in observations using the FAST telescope, confirming the neutron star nature of the compact object. This promotes the possibility that the system is indeed the first one detected containing a pulsar with magnetar behavior in it.

Variability
LS I +61 303 varies slightly at optical wavelengths, but measurements going back to 1887 show no obvious period. It also shows regular X-ray outbursts coinciding with its orbital period, and strong radio variability. It was given the variable star designation V615 Cassiopeiae.

Microquasar
LS I +61 303 emits HE and VHE (High Energy and Very High Energy) gamma rays. It is only one of several known star systems that produce such energetic rays. Other such systems are PSR B1259–63, LS 5039 and HESS J0632+057.

References

External links
Astronomers Discovery Very High Energy Gamma-ray Emission From Microquasar (ScienceDaily) May 19, 2006
MAGIC – Major Atmospheric Gamma Imaging Cerenkov Telescope
MAGIC Telescope home page
TeV gamma ray source catalog home page

Neutron stars
Microquasars
Cassiopeia (constellation)
Cassiopeiae, V615
012469
Be stars
B-type main-sequence stars
Stellar black holes